The General Union of Workers of Niger (Union Général des Travailleurs Nigériens, UGTN) is a trade union in Niger, formed in 2002 as a breakaway from the Union of Workers' Trade Unions of Niger.

See also

Trade unions in Niger

References

Trade unions in Niger
Breakaway trade unions
Trade unions established in 2002
2002 establishments in Niger